The 1982 WCHA Men's Ice Hockey Tournament was the 23rd conference playoff in league history and 30th season where a WCHA champion was crowned. The tournament was played between March 4 and March 14, 1982. First round and semifinal games were played at home team campus sites while the championship match was held at the Winter Sports Center in Grand Forks, North Dakota. By winning the tournament, Wisconsin received the WCHA's automatic bid to the 1982 NCAA Division I Men's Ice Hockey Tournament.

This as the first WCHA tournament held after the defection of four conference schools to the CCHA.

Format
All member teams were eligible for the tournament and were seeded No. 1 through No. 6 according to their final conference standing, with a tiebreaker system used to seed teams with an identical number of points accumulated. As a result of their receiving the Broadmoor Trophy, North Dakota's home venue, Winter Sports Center, served as the site for the Championship game regardless of which teams qualified for the penultimate match. Each series were two-game matchups with the team that scored the most goals advancing to the succeeding round. The top two seeded teams received byes into the semifinal round while the third seed and sixth seed and the fourth seed and fifth seed met in the first round. The teams that advanced to the semifinal were re-seeded according to the final regular season conference standings, with the first seed matched against lowest remaining seed in one semifinal game and the second seed meeting with the other advancing team with the winners meeting in the championship round. The Tournament Champion received an automatic bid to the 1982 NCAA Division I Men's Ice Hockey Tournament.

Conference standings
Note: GP = Games played; W = Wins; L = Losses; T = Ties; PTS = Points; GF = Goals For; GA = Goals Against

Bracket

Teams are reseeded after the first round

Note: * denotes overtime period(s)

First round

(3) Minnesota vs. (6) Colorado College

(4) Denver vs. (5) Minnesota-Duluth

Semifinals

(1) North Dakota vs. (4) Denver

(2) Wisconsin vs. (3) Minnesota

Championship

(1) North Dakota vs. (2) Wisconsin

Tournament awards
None

See also
Western Collegiate Hockey Association men's champions

References

External links
WCHA.com
1981–82 WCHA Standings
1981–82 NCAA Standings
2013–14 Colorado College Tigers Media Guide
2013–14 Denver Pioneers Media Guide
2013–14 Minnesota Golden Gophers Media Guide 
2012–13 Minnesota-Duluth Bulldogs Media Guide
2013–14 North Dakota Hockey Media Guide
2003–04 Wisconsin Badgers Media Guide

WCHA Men's Ice Hockey Tournament
Wcha Men's Ice Hockey Tournament